Rich Wardner (born August 26, 1942) is a former Republican member of the North Dakota Senate for the 37th district.

Biography
He graduated from Dickinson State University and received a Master's of Science from Northern State University. He worked as a science and math teacher, a football and basketball coach, and a farmer.

From 1991 to 1997, he served in the North Dakota House of Representatives. Between 1999-2022, he has served in the North Dakota Senate. Following the death of state Senator Bob Stenehjem in July 2011, he served as the Senate Majority Leader.

He is the former executive director of the Dickinson Area Chamber of Commerce. He now serves as chairman of Sunrise Youth Bureau and the Midwest Legislative Conference. He is a member of Legislative Management, the Benevolent and Protective Order of Elks, and Rotary International. In 1999, he received the Public Service Award from the North Dakota Petroleum Marketers Association.

He is married to Kayleen Wardner, and they have two children. They live in Dickinson, North Dakota.

References

1942 births
21st-century American politicians
Dickinson State University alumni
Living people
Northern State University alumni
People from Dickinson, North Dakota
Presidents pro tempore of the North Dakota Senate
Republican Party members of the North Dakota House of Representatives
Republican Party North Dakota state senators